David G. Green (born April 18, 1972 in Mount Kisco, New York) is a former running back in the National Football League. He played in 1995 for the New England Patriots. He played college football for the Boston College Eagles.

1972 births
Living people
People from Mount Kisco, New York
American football running backs
Boston College Eagles football players
New England Patriots players